The 1894 Baltimore Orioles F.C. season was the club's first and only season of existence, participating in the American League of Professional Football, an offseason soccer league established by National League owners to maintain brand relevance. The club was owned and affiliated by the baseball club of the same name.

During the 1894 season, the Orioles played only four matches, winning all four of them. Baltimore scored 24 goals and conceded only three. All four of their matches, however, were against the Washington Senators F.C.

Match results

See also 
 Baltimore Orioles F.C.
 1894 Baltimore Orioles season
 American League of Professional Football

References 

Baltimore Orioles F.C.
Baltimore Orioles Fc
Baltimore Orioles FC